Shanklish ( shanklīsh or شنغليش shanghlīsh), also known as chancliche, shinklish, shankleesh, sorke, or sürke, is a type of cow's milk or sheep milk cheese in Levantine cuisine.

Shanklish is made by curdling yoghurt, straining it, and fermenting it. It is typically formed into balls of approximately 6 cm diameter, often covered in za'atar and Aleppo pepper, and then aged and dried. 

The most common spice is thyme, thus giving the cheese its appearance somewhat resembling a rum ball. Shanklish is also sold in much smaller balls or unformed.

In Egypt, shanklish is made by fermenting Areesh cheese, usually called mesh.

Shanklish varies greatly in its texture and flavour. Fresh cheeses have a soft texture and mild flavour; those dried and aged for a longer period become progressively harder and can acquire an extremely pungent odour and flavour. To make spicier cheeses, spices such as aniseed and chilli can be mixed in before the cheese is formed into balls. Spicy shanklish are often covered in chilli, especially in Syria, thus appear red. Shanklish from the Syrian coastal plain around Tartus and the adjoining northern Lebanese region of Akkar are considered particularly delectable; these tend to be hard, with a clean strong flavour and near-white colour.

Shanklish is generally eaten with finely-chopped tomato, onion, and olive oil in a dish called Shʿifurah or Jʿifurah; and often accompanied by araq. It is a common meze dish. Shanklish is also mashed up with eggs or crushed in a pita with cucumbers, mint, and olive oil for breakfast.

References

Arab cuisine
Turkish cheeses
Lebanese cuisine
Levantine cuisine
Middle Eastern cheeses
Egyptian cheeses
Arabic words and phrases
Syrian cuisine